The Utah Valley Wolverines represent Utah Valley University in NCAA DI collegiate athletics and sponsor 16 sporting programs. The Wolverines participate in the Western Athletic Conference. The school mascot is the Wolverine, and the colors are green and white. The UVU student section is called The Den. A name change from The Mawl, the student section's previous name, was enacted in 2017. All UVU students can get their Den pass, which includes free admission to all athletic events.

Conference affiliation 
The Wolverines joined the Great West Conference in 2008. Utah Valley State College was originally a member of the NJCAA and moved to NCAA Division I in 2003. The school became Utah Valley University in 2008 and a full Division I member in the 2009–10 season following a five-year transition period as a Division I independent. They have won the GWC Commissioner's Cup each year they have competed in the conference. Each year the Cup is awarded to the institution that performed best overall in GWC-sponsored sports.  They joined the Western Athletic Conference July 1, 2013.

UVU officially accepted an invitation to join the Western Athletic Conference in all sports (with the exception of wrestling) on October 9, 2012. They became a full member on July 1, 2013, and began WAC play in the 2013–14 school year. With this move, UVU also added men's soccer in 2014. The school's wrestling team remained a member of the Western Wrestling Conference (WWC) through the 2014–15 school year. The WWC then disbanded when all of its members accepted an offer of single-sport membership in the Big 12 Conference.

Varsity sports 
Utah Valley University currently sponsors eight men's and eight women's teams in NCAA sanctioned sports:

Men’s basketball

The Wolverines play their home basketball games in the 8,500-seat Utah Community Credit Union Center. The men's basketball team finished the 2008–09 season with a 17–11 record, which capped off its 26th winning season in a row. The team is coached by two-time National Basketball Association champion Mark Madsen of the Los Angeles Lakers.

Women’s basketball

Baseball

The baseball team plays at UCCU Ballpark, a 2,500-seat facility (3,000 additional fans can sit on a grass berm that wraps around third base and left field, bringing total capacity to 5,500) that opened on March 25, 2005. UCCU Ballpark is also the home of the Orem Owlz, a minor-league affiliate of Los Angeles Angels of Anaheim, that competes in the Pioneer Baseball League.

Soccer
The men's and women's soccer team play at Clyde Field, and has seated over 2,800 fans. The women's team were ranked 23rd nationally in 2015 for average attendance in the nation. They were also crowned the Western Athletic Conference (WAC) tournament champions that year, leading them to their first ever appearance in the NCAA tournament in school history. The men's team has also been growing over the years, having only become a part of the school in 2015. The men's team also took first place in the WAC just a year later in 2016.

Track and field
The Track and Field team for Utah Valley competes at Hal Wing Track and Field. The Head coach of the track team is Scott Houle. Under Coach Houle the team has won 31 conference championships, had 12 second-place finishes, and he has won 31 coach of the year awards. The team has also had 28 individual NCAA Regional Qualifiers and had 51 Individual events qualified to the NCAA Regional Championships. There has also be 23 USTFCCCA All-Academic individuals as well. So far the track team has had 4 All-Americans, 3 in outdoor and 1 in indoor.

Wrestling

Non-varsity sports
The school also fields several non-varsity teams including, men's ice hockey, men's volleyball, men's lacrosse, and men's and women's rugby.

The men's hockey program was renewed in 2016, originally starting as a business student’s capstone project. After the first two seasons of the revived program, major changes were made to help facilitate on campus growth and the success of the team. The team currently plays as an ACHA D2 member, with short term goals of advancing to ACHA D1. There is tremendous interest among the student body with the ACHA Hockey team bringing close to capacity crowds several times a season. All games and practices are held at Peaks Ice Arena in Provo, Utah. In addition to this ACHA program, the athletic department at UVU has been pursuing adding NCAA D1 Men’s and Women’s hockey to campus. A feasibility study was completed, the results of which showed tremendous potential for a successful program. Currently, the school is working on efforts to raise the funds necessary to start and sustain the program for five years. The school has plans to construct a 5,000-7,000 seat arena on the newly acquired Geneva Campus 10 minutes away from main campus UVU. The initial target was to have a team competing by the 2027 season start. However, due to COVID-19 and financial woes it has been pushed to 2030.

Rivalries 
Since its move to Division 1, UVU has maintained rivalries with the BYU Cougars, Utah Tech Trailblazers, and Southern Utah Thunderbirds.

UCCU Crosstown Clash 
UVU and BYU are separated by just 3.4 miles from each other on University Parkway. The schools meet across men's and women's basketball, women's soccer, volleyball, baseball, and softball. Whilst BYU dominated the rivalry early on, recent seasons have seen the Wolverines win twice in a row against BYU in men's basketball, and UVU's women's soccer program upset the Cougars in Provo.

Old Hammer Rivalry 
Utah Valley and Utah Tech have had rivalry meetings way back since both schools were at the junior college level. When Utah Tech announced they would be joining Division 1 in the Western Athletic Conference, the schools announced they would renew the Old Hammer Rivalry as they would now be conference foes. The schools match up in men's and women's soccer, volleyball, men's and women's basketball, softball, and baseball.

UVU - SUU Rivalry 
Whilst not official, the Wolverines have also seen an emerging rivalry with the Southern Utah Thunderbirds, particularly in men's basketball. This has only increased since SUU also joined the WAC in 2022.

Alumni
Ronnie Price – basketball player for the Utah Jazz of the NBA
Noelle Pikus-Pace – American skeleton racer and silver medalist at the 2014 Winter Olympics
Travis Hansen – former basketball player for the Atlanta Hawks of the NBA
Skyler Milne – Soccer player for the Real Monarchs of the USL

References

External links